La Voce del Popolo is an Italian-language daily newspaper published by EDIT (EDizioni ITaliane) in the Croatian city of Rijeka.

History and profile
La Voce del Popolo was first published in October 1944. The paper was supported by Josip Broz Tito and the Yugoslav partisans, taking its name from a paper which had been printed in Fiume (as Rijeka was then called) from 1885 until its suppression following the city’s annexation to the Fascist Kingdom of Italy in 1924. During the post-World War II period it became the newspaper of the sizeable Italian community in Yugoslavia. With the independence of Slovenia and Croatia, La Voce del Popolo has continued to campaign for the Italian communities of the area as well as being read by Italian tourists in the summer. A monthly supplement focusing on the Italians of Dalmatia has been recently added.

References

External links
 La voce del popolo Official site 
 EDIT, Edizioni Italiane 
 Voce del Popolo, La at lzmk.hr 

1944 establishments in Yugoslavia
Publications established in 1944
Daily newspapers published in Croatia
Italian-language newspapers
Mass media in Rijeka